Seven ships of the Royal Navy have borne the name HMS Peterel:

  (ex-Duchess of Manchester) was a survey sloop,  purchased in 1777 and sold in 1788.
  (also known as Peterell) was a 24-gun sloop launched in 1794. She was sold in 1827.
  was a 6-gun packet brig-sloop launched in 1838 and sold off in 1862.
  was a wooden screw  sloop launched in 1860 and sold off in 1901.
  was a  launched in 1899 and sold off in 1919.
  was a river gunboat launched in 1927 and sunk in 1941.
  was a  launched in 1976 and sold in 1991.

References
 

Royal Navy ship names